Cramlington is a railway station on the East Coast Main Line, which runs between  and . It is owned by Network Rail and managed by Northern Trains.

History
The station was opened by the Newcastle and Berwick Railway on 1 March 1847.

From November 2021 to May 2022, the footbridge was refurbished.

Facilities
The station is unstaffed. In February 2019, the local Council installed a ticket machine on the southbound platform. The machine allows contactless, and card for tickets, as well as being able to collect tickets. Travel tickets can still be purchased on board the train. There are waiting shelters on both platforms (but no other permanent buildings), along with timetable posters and next train real-time information boards to offer train running details.  Step-free access is available to both platforms, though the footbridge linking them has steps.

Northumberland County Council and the local rail users group SENRUG is campaigning to relocate the station to a new site 200 metres south of its present position, in order to better serve the town's Manor Walks shopping centre, Westmorland Retail Park and main employment areas.  The proposed site would also allow for the construction of a dedicated bus-rail interchange, a larger car park and serve several residential estates to the west built in the 1960s and 1970s.

Services

Northern Trains

As of the December 2021 timetable change, there is an hourly service between Newcastle and Morpeth. Most services extend to Carlisle via Hexham. At peak times, two trains per day (excluding Sunday) extend to Chathill. At present, all services are operated by Northern Trains.

Rolling stock used: Class 156 Super Sprinter and Class 158 Express Sprinter

TransPennine Express
In September 2021, TransPennine Express announced that they were seeking approval to have some of the services on their new five return trains weekday semi-fast Newcastle to Edinburgh return trains call at Cramlington. As of 24 February 2023, TransPennine Express operate a limited service of one train to Newcastle on Mondays to Saturdays, with no Sunday service and no northbound service.

Rolling stock used: Class 802 Nova 1

Accidents and incidents
 On 26 May 1926, during the General Strike, an express passenger train was deliberately derailed south of the station.

References

External links
 

Railway stations in Northumberland
DfT Category F2 stations
Former North Eastern Railway (UK) stations
Railway stations in Great Britain opened in 1847
Northern franchise railway stations
Railway stations served by TransPennine Express
1847 establishments in England
Cramlington